Tricalcium phosphate (sometimes abbreviated TCP), more commonly known as Calcium phosphate, is a calcium salt of phosphoric acid with the chemical formula Ca3(PO4)2. It is also known as tribasic calcium phosphate and bone phosphate of lime (BPL). It is a white solid of low solubility.  Most commercial samples of "tricalcium phosphate" are in fact hydroxyapatite.

It exists as three crystalline polymorphs α, α′, and β. The α and α′ states are stable at high temperatures.

Nomenclature

Calcium phosphate refers to numerous materials consisting of calcium ions (Ca2+) together with orthophosphates, metaphosphates or pyrophosphates and occasionally oxide and hydroxide ions. Especially, the common mineral apatite has formula Ca5(PO4)3X, where X is F, Cl, OH, or a mixture; it is hydroxyapatite if the extra ion is mainly hydroxide. Much of the "tricalcium phosphate" on the market is actually powdered hydroxyapatite.

Preparation 
Tricalcium phosphate is produced commercially by treating hydroxyapatite with phosphoric acid and slaked lime.

It cannot be precipitated directly from aqueous solution. Typically double decomposition reactions are employed, involving a soluble phosphate and calcium salts, e.g. (NH4)2HPO4 + Ca(NO3)2. is performed under carefully controlled pH conditions. The precipitate will either be "amorphous tricalcium phosphate", ATCP, or  calcium deficient hydroxyapatite, CDHA, Ca9(HPO4)(PO4)5(OH), (note CDHA is sometimes termed apatitic calcium triphosphate). Crystalline tricalcium phosphate can be obtained by calcining the precipitate. β-Ca3(PO4)2 is generally formed, higher temperatures are required to produce α-Ca3(PO4)2.

An alternative to the wet procedure entails heating a mixture of a calcium pyrophosphate and calcium carbonate:
CaCO3 + Ca2P2O7  →   Ca3(PO4)2 + CO2

Structure of β-, α- and α′- Ca3(PO4)2 polymorphs
Tricalcium phosphate has three recognised polymorphs, the rhombohedral β form (shown above), and two high temperature forms, monoclinic α and hexagonal α′. β-Tricalcium phosphate has a crystallographic density of 3.066 g cm−3 while the high temperature forms are less dense, α-tricalcium phosphate has a density of 2.866 g cm−3 and α′-tricalcium phosphate has a density of 2.702 g cm−3 All forms have complex structures consisting of tetrahedral phosphate centers linked through oxygen to the calcium ions. The high temperature forms each have two types of columns, one containing only calcium ions and the other both calcium and phosphate.

There are differences in chemical and biological properties between the beta and alpha forms, the α form is more soluble and biodegradable. Both forms are available commercially and are present in formulations used in medical and dental applications.

Occurrence
Calcium phosphate is one of the main combustion products of bone (see bone ash). Calcium phosphate is also commonly derived from inorganic sources such as mineral rock.
Tricalcium phosphate occurs naturally in several forms, including:
 as a rock in Morocco, Israel, Philippines, Egypt, and Kola (Russia) and in smaller quantities in some other countries.  The natural form is not completely pure, and there are some other components like sand and lime which can change the composition.  In terms of P2O5, most calcium phosphate rocks have a content of 30% to 40% P2O5 in weight.
 in the skeletons and teeth of vertebrate animals
 in milk.

Biphasic tricalcium phosphate, BCP
Biphasic tricalcium phosphate, BCP, was originally reported as tricalcium phosphate, but X-Ray diffraction techniques showed that the material was an intimate mixture of two phases, hydroxyapatite (HA) and β-tricalcium phosphate. It is a ceramic.
Preparation involves the sintering causing the irreversible decomposition of calcium deficient apatites alternatively termed non-stoichiometric apatites or basic calcium phosphate,  an example is:

Ca10−δ(PO4)6−δ(HPO4)δ(OH)2−δ → (1−δ) Ca10(PO4)6(OH)2 + 3δ Ca3(PO4)2

β-TCP can contain impurities, for example calcium pyrophosphate, CaP2O7 and apatite. β-TCP is bioresorbable. The biodegradation of BCP involves faster dissolution of the β-TCP phase followed by elimination of HA crystals. β-TCP does not dissolve in body fluids at physiological pH levels, dissolution requires cell activity producing acidic pH.

Uses

Food additive
Tricalcium phosphate is used in powdered spices as an anticaking agent, e.g. to prevent table salt from caking.  The calcium phosphates have been assigned European food additive number E341.

Health and beauty products
It is also found in baby powder, antacids and toothpaste.

Biomedical
It is also used as a nutritional supplement and occurs naturally in cow milk, although the most common and economical forms for supplementation are calcium carbonate (which should be taken with food) and calcium citrate (which can be taken without food).  There is some debate about the different bioavailabilities of the different calcium salts.

It can be used as a tissue replacement for repairing bony defects when autogenous bone graft is not feasible or possible.  It may be used alone or in combination with a biodegradable, resorbable polymer such as polyglycolic acid.  It may also be combined with autologous materials for a bone graft.

Porous beta-tricalcium phosphate scaffolds are employed as drug carrier systems for local drug delivery in bone.

Natural occurrence
Tuite, a natural analogue of tricalcium orthophosphate(V), is a rare component of some meteorites. Its formation is related to shock metamorphism.

References

Biomaterials
Calcium compounds
Phosphates
E-number additives